Richard Greenblatt may refer to:

Richard Greenblatt (programmer) (born 1944), American computer programmer
Richard Greenblatt (playwright) (born 1953), Canadian actor and playwright